South Basildon and East Thurrock is a constituency represented in the House of Commons of the UK Parliament since its 2010 creation by Stephen Metcalfe, a Conservative.

History
The seat was created for the 2010 general election following a review of the Parliamentary representation of Essex by the Boundary Commission for England.  It was formed from the majority of the abolished constituency of Basildon, but excluding the centre of Basildon itself, together with the town of Pitsea from the abolished Billericay constituency.

Its predecessor seat, Basildon, was a much-referenced bellwether seat, having consistently voted for the most successful party (in terms of number of seats) in each election since its 1974 creation. However, the boundaries of the new South Basildon and East Thurrock seat were considered much more favourable to the Conservatives than those of the old Basildon seat.

Before 1974 the area came within the older version of the Billericay constituency and, for just five years before 1950, this area was the eastern part of the Thurrock seat – from 1885 to 1945 the area was within the South East Essex seat.  From 1832 to 1885 the area was in the South Essex seat.

Boundaries
* The Borough of Thurrock wards of Corringham and Fobbing, East Tilbury, Orsett, Stanford East and Corringham Town, Stanford-le-Hope West and The Homesteads 
 The Borough of Basildon wards of Langdon Hills, Nethermayne, Pitsea North West, Pitsea South East and Vange.

Despite its long name, this new constituency is to the greatest extent the successor to the Basildon constituency.

The Basildon constituency that existed after 1997 was never wholly within the Basildon district, nor even contained the whole of the Basildon urban area, but it extended south into the Thurrock council area to take in towns such as Stanford-le-Hope and Corringham.

This new seat retained all of the Thurrock wards, lost some areas around central Basildon, and replaced them with Pitsea to the east of Basildon. Additionally, the ward of East Tilbury was added from the Thurrock constituency.

Constituency profile 
The seat has a very similar proportion (4.0%) of jobseekers to the national average of 3.8%, based on The Guardian'''s November 2012 study. This is higher than the average for the Eastern counties of 3.1% but significantly lower than Bedford, Great Yarmouth, Peterborough, Luton South, Rochford and Southend East, and Thurrock seats.

 Members of Parliament 

Elections
Elections in the 2010s

 

* Served as an MP in the 2005–2010 Parliament''

See also
List of parliamentary constituencies in Essex

Notes

References

Politics of Thurrock
Parliamentary constituencies in Essex
Constituencies of the Parliament of the United Kingdom established in 2010
Politics of the Borough of Basildon